The Sonata for Violoncello and Piano in A major by Hubert Parry is a sonata for cello and piano composed between 1879 and 1880, but not published until 1883.

Background
Hubert Parry began work on the Cello Sonata in 1879 shortly after he completed his Piano Quintet. Intended for French Cellist Jules-Bernard Lasserre, the work was not finished until early 1880. Despite a successful premiere on the 12th of February 1880, Parry was dissatisfied with the work and revised it extensively before publication by Novello in 1883 with a dedication to Lasserre.

Structure

The composition is in three movements:

 Allegro
 Andante
 Maestoso - Allegro

Typical performances take around 25 - 26 minutes.

References
Notes

Sources

External links
 
  - Analysis and Soundbites
 

Compositions by Hubert Parry
Compositions in A major
Parry
1883 compositions
Music dedicated to ensembles or performers